The 2012–13 Premier Arena Soccer League season consists of 46 teams grouped into 6 divisions across the US. The Premier Arena Soccer League continues to serve as the developmental league to the Professional Arena Soccer League.

Standings
As of March 9, 2013 

(Bold Division Winner, automatic National Finals Qualifier)

Division Playoffs
Northwest Division Semifinals
Fri. Feb. 15, 8:15 pm: Kitsap Pumas 12, Wenatchee Fire 2 
Fri. Feb. 15, 8:30 pm: South Sound Shock 8, WSA Rapids 7
Finals
Sun. Feb. 17, 1:00 pm: South Sound Shock 7, Kitsap Pumas 4

South Central Division Semifinals
Sat. Feb. 16, 5:15 pm: Vitesse Dallas 6, Texas Xtreme 3
Sat. Feb. 16, 7:00 pm: Austin Gunners 4, Alamo City Warriors 2
Finals
Sun. Feb. 17, 1:00 pm: Vitesse Dallas 9, Austin Gunners 8

Midwest Division Finals
Sat. Feb. 16, 7:30 pm: Cincy Saints 6, River City Legends 2

2012-13 PASL-Premier Finals
The finals will be played at San Diego, California, on March 10–11, 2013.

Preliminary round
 (Preliminary Round games consists of two 18 minute halves.)

 
Sun. March 10, 2013
9:00 AM - South Sound Shock 7, Las Vegas Knights 2
9:45 AM - San Diego Sockers Reserves 2, Bladium Rosal 2
10:30 AM - Colorado Blizzard 7, OTW Santa Clara 3
11:15 AM - Detroit Waza Reserves 5, Las Vegas Knights 4
12:00 PM - South Sound Shock 2, Bladium Rosal 2
12:45 PM - Colorado Blizzard 2, San Diego Sockers Reserves 1
1:30 PM - Detroit Waza Reserves 7, OTW Santa Clara 3

Knockout round
Mon. March 11, 2013 Quarterfinals (two 18 minute halves)
Detroit Waza Reserves (Bye)
9:45 AM - Bladium Rosal 5, San Diego Sockers Reserves 3
10:30 AM - South Sound Shock 5, Las Vegas Knights 3
11:15 AM - Colorado Blizzard 7, OTW Santa Clara 3

 Semifinals (two 18-minute halves)
1:00 PM - Bladium Rosal 6, Detroit Waza Reserves 2
1:45 PM - Colorado Blizzard 6, South Sound Shock 0

 Final (four 10-minute periods)
5:45 PM - Bladium Rosal 4, Colorado Blizzard 1

References

Premier Arena Soccer League seasons
Premier
Premier